Six Figures is the second studio album by American rapper D-Shot, released on July 29, 1997, on Jive Records and D-Shot's own label, Shot Records. The album was produced by Femi Ojetunde, Levitti, Studio Ton and D-Shot. It peaked at number 21 on the Billboard Top R&B/Hip-Hop Albums and at number 81 on the Billboard 200. The album features guest performances by Spice 1, E-40, B-Legit, Celly Cel, Too Short, Mac Shawn, Levitti, and Bo-Roc of the Dove Shack.

The song "(I'll Be Yo') Huckleberry" was originally heard in the film Booty Call, and was also released as a single to promote the film's soundtrack album.

Both "(I'll Be Yo') Huckleberry" and "True Worldwide Playaz" were later included on the 1999 compilation album Sick Wid It's Greatest Hits.

Critical reception 

Allmusic – "...Six Figures, offers enough straight hardcore dope to make it worthwhile for any gangsta aficionado. D-Shot's rhyming is deft, and even if he simply recycles gangsta themes, he does it well... it's still a strong listen, filled with hard grooves and harder rhyming."

Rap Pages – "...Not only does D-Shot raise his own status and that of some lesser known Bay Area rappers, he corrals some of the Bay's best R&B voices..."

Track listing 
"They Call Him Shot" – 1:30
"Duck" (featuring E-40 & B-Legit) – 4:19
"Out Tha' Pen" – 3:13 
"Great Britain International...Head/Lee/Own" (featuring Levitti) – 4:40
"I'll Be Your Friend" (featuring Celly Cel, Mississippi & Levitti) – 4:45
"One More Shot" (featuring Mr. Malik & Mac Shawn) – 5:09
"True Worldwide Playaz" (featuring Too Short, Spice 1 & Bo-Roc) – 4:37
"It's Ma Thang" (featuring Kaveo & Bo-Roc) – 4:02
"Six Figures" (featuring Celly Cel & Levitti) – 3:47
"Huckleberry Hotline" – 1:17
"(I'll Be Yo') Huckleberry" (featuring E-40, Levitti & Saulter Twins) – 4:38
"Is It Cool To Fuck" (featuring G-Note) – 4:45 
"Reversal Interlude" – 3:01

Chart history

References

External links 
 Six Figures at Discogs
 Six Figures at MusicBrainz
 Six Figures at Tower Records

1997 albums
Albums produced by Studio Ton
D-Shot albums
Jive Records albums
West Coast hip hop albums